Kamwenge Subcounty is a settlement in Kamwenge District, Western Uganda. It is predominantly a rural sub county with Ganyenda and Nyabitusi as the main trading centres. It has five− parishes; Ganyenda, Nkongoro, Kyabandara, Kiziba and Busingye.

References 

Kamwenge District
Populated places in Uganda